Utricularia purpurea, the eastern purple bladderwort, is a medium-sized suspended aquatic carnivorous plant that belongs to the genus Utricularia. U. purpurea is endemic to North and Central America. It has been suggested that U. purpurea may have partially lost its appetite for carnivory. Richards (2001) did an extensive study in the field on it and noted that trapping rates of the usual Utricularia prey were significantly lower than in other species in the genus. Richards concludes that this species can still trap and digest arthropod prey in its specialized bladder traps, but does so sparingly. Instead, it harbors a community of algae, zooplankton, and debris in the bladders that indicates U. purpurea favors a mutualistic interaction in place of a predator–prey relationship.

See also 
 List of Utricularia species

References 

Carnivorous plants of Central America
Carnivorous plants of North America
Flora of Eastern Canada
Flora of the Great Lakes region (North America)
Flora of the Eastern United States
Flora of Texas
Flora of Belize
Flora of Costa Rica
Flora of Cuba
Flora of the Bahamas
purpurea
Flora without expected TNC conservation status